Valdemar Christoffer Nielsen (21 September 1893 – 16 May 1972) was a Danish cyclist. He competed in two events at the 1912 Summer Olympics.

References

External links
 

1893 births
1972 deaths
Danish male cyclists
Olympic cyclists of Denmark
Cyclists at the 1912 Summer Olympics
Cyclists from Copenhagen